Doom WAD is the default format of package files for the video game Doom and its sequel Doom II: Hell on Earth, that contain sprites, levels, and game data. WAD stands for Where's All the Data? Immediately after its release in 1993, Doom attracted a sizeable following of players who created their own mods for WAD files—packages containing new levels or graphics—and played a vital part in spawning the mod-making culture which is now commonplace for first-person shooter games. Thousands of WADs have been created for Doom, ranging from single custom levels to full original games; most of these can be freely downloaded over the Internet. Several WADs have also been released commercially, and for some people the WAD-making hobby became a gateway to a professional career as a level designer.

There are two types of WADs: IWADs (internal WADs) and PWADs (patch WADs). IWADs contain the data necessary to load the game, while PWADs contain additional data, such as new character sprites, as necessary for custom levels.

History of WADs

Development of Doom
When developing Doom, id Software was aware that many players had tried to create custom levels and other modifications for their previous game, Wolfenstein 3D. However, the procedures involved in creating and loading modifications for that game were cumbersome.

John Carmack, lead programmer at id Software, designed the Doom internals from the ground up to allow players to extend the game. For that reason, game data such as levels, graphics, sound effects, and music are stored separately from the game engine, in "WAD" files, allowing for third parties to make new games without making any modifications to the engine. Tom Hall is responsible for coming up with the name WAD.

The idea of making Doom easily modifiable was primarily backed by Carmack, a well-known supporter of copyleft and the hacker ideal of people sharing and building upon each other's work, and by John Romero, who had hacked games in his youth and wanted to allow other gamers to do the same. However, some, including Jay Wilbur and Kevin Cloud, objected due to legal concerns and the belief that it would not be of any benefit to the company's business.

Utilities and WADs
Immediately after the initial shareware release of Doom on December 10, 1993, players began working on various tools to modify the game. On January 26, 1994, Brendon Wyber released the first public domain version of the Doom Editing Utility (DEU) program on the Internet, a program created by Doom fans which made it possible to create entirely new levels. DEU continued development until May 21 of the same year. It was made possible by Matt Fell's release of the Unofficial Doom specifications. Shortly thereafter, Doom players became involved with further enhancing DEU. Raphaël Quinet spearheaded the program development efforts and overall project release, while Steve Bareman lead the documentation effort and creation of the DEU Tutorial. More than 30 other people also helped with the effort and their names appear in the README file included with the program distribution. Yadex, a fork of DEU 5.21 for Unix systems running the X Window System, was later released under the GNU/GPL license. Carmack additionally released the source code for the utilities used to create the game, but these were programmed in Objective-C, for NeXT workstations, and were therefore not directly usable the mass userbase of IBM PC compatible.

Jeff Bird is credited with creating the first custom WAD for Doom, called Origwad, on March 7, 1994. Soon, countless players were creating custom WADs and sharing them over AOL, the CompuServe forums, and other Internet-based channels. Many of the WADs were made in the style of the base game, others were based on existing TV series, movies, or original themes. Some of the id Software staff have revealed that they were impressed by some of the WADs. John Carmack later said the following about a Star Wars-themed modification:

Another early modification is Aliens TC, a total conversion based on the movie Aliens.

Even though WADs modified Doom by replacing graphics and audio, the amount of customization was somewhat limited; much of the game's behavior, including the timing and strength of weapons and enemies, was hard-coded in the Doom executable file and impossible to alter in WADs. DeHackEd, a Doom editing program created by Greg Lewis, addressed this by letting users modify parameters inside of the Doom executable itself, allowing for a greater degree of customization.

Commercial WADs

Around 1994 and 1995, WADs were distributed primarily through BBSs and via CD collections found in computer shops or bundled together with instruction guides for level creation, while in later years Internet FTP servers became the primary method for obtaining these works. Although the Doom software license required that no profit be made from custom WADs, and Shawn Green objected to people selling their WADs for money, some WAD sets and shovelware bundles were nonetheless obtainable for a price at certain outlets.

During this time, id Software was working on their next game, Quake, using new technology, but started projects picking up the most talented WAD makers from the Doom community to create official expansions and to compete with the unauthorized collection CDs. The team produced the 21 Master Levels, which, on December 26, 1995, were released on a CD along with Maximum Doom, a collection of 1,830 WADs that had been downloaded from the Internet. In 1996, Final Doom, a package of two 32-level megawads created by TeamTNT, was released as an official id Software product.

Various first-person shooter games released at the time use the Doom engine under a commercial license from id Software, as such essentially being custom WADs packaged with the Doom engine, such as Hacx: Twitch 'n Kill (1997).

In addition to the many people who contributed to commercially released WADs, various authors became involved with the development of other games:
 Kenneth Scott, who contributed artwork to Hacx: Twitch 'n Kill, later became the art director at id Software and 343 Industries on the post-Bungie Halo games.
 Tim Willits, who contributed two levels to Master Levels for Doom II, later became the lead designer at id Software.
 Dario Casali, author of a quarter of Final Doom, was hired by Valve to work on Half-Life.
 Sverre Kvernmo, designer of five levels in Master Levels for Doom II and member of TeamTNT, was hired by Ion Storm for Daikatana.
 Iikka Keränen, author of several Doom WADs and later Quake mods, was hired by Ion Storm to create levels for Anachronox and Daikatana, and by Looking Glass Studios to create levels for Thief II: The Metal Age. Keränen was later hired by Valve.
 John Anderson (level designer), also known as "Dr. Sleep", author of five levels in Master Levels for Doom II and E4M7 in The Ultimate Doom, later worked on Blood, Unreal, and Daikatana.
 Matthias Worch (level designer) joined Ritual Entertainment to work on SiN. He later contributed to the Unreal series.

Source port era

Around 1997, interest in Doom WADs began to decline, as attention was drawn to newer games with more advanced technology and more customizable design, including id Software's own Quake and Quake II.

On December 23, 1997, id Software released the source code to the Doom engine, initially under a restrictive license. On October 3, 1999, it was released again under the terms of the GNU GPL-2.0-or-later. With the source code available, it became possible for programmers to modify any aspect of the game, remove technical limitations and bugs, and add entirely new features.

These engine modifications, or Doom source ports, have since become the target for much of the WAD editing activity, and with the decline of MS-DOS, using a source port became the only feasible way to play Doom for most people. Several source ports are in active development, and Doom retains a strong following of WAD creators.

Types of WADs

Levels
The most common type of WAD consists of a single level, usually retaining the theme of the original game, but possibly including new music and some modified graphics to define a more distinctive setting or mood. Both single-player and deathmatch multiplayer levels are common.

WADs may have a level pack in the form of an episode, replacing nine levels, and sometimes in the form of a megawad, which replaces 15 or more levels in the game (27 in Doom, 32 in Doom II, 36 in The Ultimate Doom).

Total conversions
A WAD that gives the game an overhaul to incorporate an entirely different game setting, character set, and story, instead of simply providing new levels or graphic changes, is called a total conversion. The phrase was coined by Justin Fisher, as part of the title of Aliens TC, or Aliens Total Conversion. Add-ons that provide extensive changes to a similar degree but retain distinctive parts or characteristics of the original games, such as characters or weapons, are often by extension called partial conversions.

List of WADs
The following is a select listing of popular and historically significant WADs.

Megawads

 Bloom is a Doom II and Blood crossover released by Bloom Team in 2021. It features over 50 new enemy types, a new episode and an original soundtrack.

 Eternal Doom is a 32-level megawad for Doom II created by Team Eternal and TeamTNT. It was released non-commercially in several versions, with the final one being released on November 14, 1997. Eternal Doom received media attention in 2020, when through further modding, it was played through Doom Eternal.
Going Down is a 32-level megawad for Doom II released in 2013, and a winner in that year's Cacowards. It was created by the English freelance animator Cyriak Harris. 
Icarus: Alien Vanguard is a 32-level megawad for Doom II created by TeamTNT and released on March 22, 1996. It was developed as a freeware release after TNT: Evilution was picked up by id Software to be released as part of Final Doom.
 Memento Mori is a 32-level megawad for Doom II created by two members of The Innocent Crew, Denis and Thomas Möller, along with other authors, including Tom Mustaine and both Dario and Milo Casali. It was initially released on December 10, 1995, and saw an updated release in February 1996. A 32-level sequel megawad, Memento Mori II, was created and released on July 27, 1996. In Doomworld's Top 100 WADs of All Time, Memento Mori was voted as the #1 WAD of 1996, and its sequel as #2.
 Requiem is a 32-level megawad for Doom II created by the same people that worked on the previously released Memento Mori series, in addition to some new mappers that worked specifically on this project. It was released and uploaded on the idgames archive on July 4, 1997.
 In 2016, John Romero released two new maps – Phobos Mission Control and Tech Gone Bad. After the positive response, he released Sigil, a complete 9-level episode, in May 2019.

Total conversions
 Action Doom 2: Urban Brawl is a 2008 indie game developed by "Scuba Steve" Browning with the ZDoom source port. The game features cel-shaded graphics reminiscent of a comic book, and is played in the style of a beat 'em up, with some gunplay present as well.
 Aliens TC is an 11-level total conversion based on the movie Aliens, created by Justin Fisher and released on November 3, 1994. In 2017, another modder by the name of Kontra_Kommando made a remake of Aliens TC.
Ashes 2063 is a post-apocalypse themed TC created by Vostyok. Inspired by 1980s post-apocalyptic movies, it features new monsters, weapons and an original soundtrack.
 Batman Doom is a 32-level total conversion created by ACE Team Software and released in April 1999. It contains modified game behavior along with new weapons, items, and characters from the world of the comic book superhero Batman.
 Chex Quest is a 5-level total conversion released in 1996 by Digital Café so that Doom could be approved for younger audiences. This was originally packaged in Chex cereal boxes as a prize, though Chex Quest was later put up as freeware on the Internet after the promotion ended. Chex Quest received two sequels, Chex Quest 2: Flemoids Take Chextropolis and Chex Quest 3, released in 1997 and 2008, respectively, both of which contained five levels and were released as freeware.
 Doom 64: Retribution is a remake of Doom 64, the Nintendo 64 version of Doom, which differs drastically from its DOS version. Doom 64: Retribution contains different levels, graphics, and audio based on the Nintendo 64 game.
Grezzo 2 is a 2012 total conversion developed by Italian game designer Nicola Piro, notable for plagiarizing other games and Doom mods, and for its vulgar, blasphemous content.
 Sonic Robo Blast 2 is a Doom modification that uses the Doom Legacy source port to completely change the game from a first-person shooter to a third-person platformer based on Sonic the Hedgehog.
 Void is a single-level modification based on the 2000 game American McGee's Alice, which was itself made by former id Software employee American McGee.

Miscellaneous

 D!Zone – Created by WizardWorks, an expansion pack featuring hundreds of levels for Doom and Doom II . D!Zone was reviewed in 1995 in Dragon by Jay & Dee in the "Eye of the Monitor" column. Jay gave the pack 1 out of 5 stars, while Dee gave the pack 1½ stars.
 Origwad – Created by Jeff Bird and released on March 7, 1994, it is notable for being the first custom WAD to be released for Doom. Origwad consists of a single level with two rooms separated by one door, and a total of six enemies, making it very basic compared to later WADs.

 The Harris levels – Doom and Doom II levels created by Eric Harris, one of the two perpetrators of the Columbine High School massacre, believed to have surfaced on the Internet in 1996 or 1997, but were taken down by the FBI after the 1999 massacre. Downloads for the levels Deathmatching in Bricks (BRICKS.WAD), Hockey.wad (HOCKEY.WAD), KILLER (KILLER.WAD), Mortal Kombat Doom (FIGHTME.WAD), Outdoors (outdoors.wad), Station (STATION.WAD), and UAC Labs (UACLABS.WAD) have been found in the years since. Dylan Klebold, a friend of Harris and the other perpetrator of the massacre, was credited by Harris for playtesting Deathmatching in Bricks. The ENDOOM screen for UAC Labs shows the names of other WADs made by Harris, though they have since been lost: Assault, Techout, Thrasher, Realdeth, and Realdoom, which is a patch for another WAD. UAC Labs was mentioned in Doomworld's Top 10 Infamous WADs list. 
Lullaby, a level created by Danlex in 2021 which contained surreal visuals. 
National Videogame Museum, a recreation of the real life National Videogame Museum by employee Chris Bacarani. The level took over a year to make, and is featured as an exhibit in the physical museum. 
Nuts! – Released in 2001, Nuts is one of the first documented joke WADs. Nuts consists of a single room, with an invulnerability power up, plasma rifle, BFG, and 10,617 enemy monsters. Its creator, B.P.R.D, created multiple sequels, and a version of Nuts was made in Dusk.
 The Sky May Be – A notable joke WAD, most of the game takes place in an oversized sector, where many textures are replaced with solid colors, and many sounds replaced with audio from Monty Python's Flying Circus. The WAD was mentioned in Doomworld's The Top 10 Infamous WADs list and it is sometimes considered to be one of the worst WADs ever created.
 UAC Military Nightmare – A Skulltag WAD made by "Terry" in 2008 which was notorious for its use of vulgar scripts, jump scares, strange graphics, absurd difficulty, and otherwise-useless data that existed to either bloat the WAD's file size or tamper with the player's settings. The WAD itself was removed from Doomworld in 2014 due to the aforementioned useless data, but has since been reuploaded with said data removed. This WAD spawned a genre of WADs known as "Terrywads", or "Terry Traps", which contain similar content to UAC Military Nightmare. In 2008, UAC Military Nightmare received a Cacoward for Worst WAD, wherein it is described as "the worst wad file the world has ever known."
Lilith – A mod created in 2017 that uses glitches in the Zdoom sourceport to create graphical and musical distortion, and changes in enemy behavior, resulting in a "glitchcore nightmare." Lilith was also a winner in the 2017 Cacowards.

Freedoom

Freedoom is a project aiming to create a free replacement (modified BSD License) for the set of graphics, music, sound effects, and levels (and miscellaneous other resources) used by Doom. Since the Doom engine is free software, it can be distributed along with the new resources, in effect providing a full game that is free and with full third party WAD.

The project distributes three IWAD files: the two single-player campaigns named Freedoom: Phase 1 and Freedoom: Phase 2, and FreeDM, which contains a collection of deathmatch levels. Freedoom does not require any source port to run, and can run on any limit-removing source port of Doom.

A similar project, Blasphemer, aims to create a complete free version of Heretic, but is less fully developed than Freedoom. Zauberer was also been initiated for Hexen.

Editing
Many level editors are available for Doom. The original Doom Editing Utility (DEU) was ported to a number of operating systems, but lost significance over time; many modern Doom editors still have their roots in DEU and its editing paradigm, including DETH, DeePsea, Linux Doom Editor, and Yadex and its fork Eureka. Other level editors include WadAuthor, Doom Builder (released in January 2003), and Doom Builder 2 (released in May 2009 as the successor to Doom Builder). Some Doom level editors, such as Doom Builder and Doom Builder 2, feature a 3D editing mode. As of now, these two have been discontinued, but a newer fork has been released and is regularly updated, known as GZDoom Builder. GZDoom Builder is also discontinued and is now being maintained as Ultimate Doom Builder.

Many specialized Doom editors are used to modify graphics and audio lumps, such asXWE, SLADE, Wintex, and SLumpEd. The DeHackEd executable patching utility modifies monsters, items, and weapon behavior. In ZDoom, users can create new monsters, weapons, and items through a scripting language called DECORATE, made to address many of the shortcomings of DeHackEd, such as not being able to add new objects, and not being able to deviate far from the behavior of the original weapons and monsters.

WAD2 and WAD3
In Quake, WAD files were replaced with PAK files. WAD files still remain in Quake files, though their use is limited to textures. Since WAD2 and WAD3 use a slightly larger directory structure, they are incompatible with Doom.

References

Bibliography
 Joseph Bell, David Skrede: The Doom Construction Kit: Mastering and Modifying Doom, Waite Group Press (April 1, 1995), 
 Richard H. "Hank" Leukart, III: The Doom Hacker's Guide, Mis Press (March 1, 1995), 
 Steve Benner, et al.: 3D Game Alchemy for Doom, Doom II, Heretic and Hexen, SAMS Publishing (1996), 
 Kushner, David: Masters of Doom: How Two Guys Created an Empire and Transformed Pop Culture, Random House Publishing Group 2003, ; pages 166–169
 Larsen, Henrik: The Unofficial Master Levels for Doom II FAQ, version 1.02 (retrieved October 4, 2004)

Further reading
 Zak, Robert (December 2018). "The ultimate guide to modding Doom" TechRadar
Hamilton, Andi (December 2018). "The cult of Doom: the thriving mod scene behind id's classic" PC Gamer

External links 

Doomworld: The Top 100 WADs Of All Time (retrieved December 6, 2004)

Doom (franchise)
 
Copyleft media
Fan labor